Ust-Dzhilinda is a rural locality (a settlement) in Bauntovsky District, Republic of Buryatia, Russia. The population was 307 as of 2010. There are 9 streets.

Geography 
Ust-Dzhilinda is located 164 km southwest of Bagdarin (the district's administrative centre) by road.

References 

Rural localities in Bauntovsky District